The Mixed synchronized 3 metre springboard competition at the 2022 World Aquatics Championships was held on 29 June 2022.

Results
The event was started at 19:00.

References

Mixed synchronized 3 metre springboard